Achillea filipendulina, the yarrow, fernleaf yarrow, milfoil, or nosebleed, is an Asian species of flowering plant in the sunflower family, native to  central and southwestern Asia (Kazakhstan, Afghanistan, Pakistan, Iran, Iraq, Turkey, Caucasus). It is also naturalized in parts of Europe and North America.

Description
The leaves are linear, pinnate, lobed and serrated, hairy and rough. The smaller corymbs are arched or convex, causing the cluster or compound corymb to present an uneven surface. In the species the small flowers are of rich 'old gold' yellow colour, and are very rigid, almost hard. The flowering period is mid to late summer.

Cultivation
Achillea  filipendulina is cultivated in temperate regions as a flowering ornamental plant.  Ordinary garden loam and other soils support its growth. It is best grown in full sun, and is drought tolerant when established. Propagation is by seed or root division in spring.

The species has generally been superseded by numerous improved cultivars, of which the following have gained the Royal Horticultural Society's Award of Garden Merit:-

 'Coronation Gold' 
 'Credo'  
 'Cloth of Gold'  
 'Gold Plate'  
 'Heidi'  
 'Hella Glashoff'  
 'Lachsschönheit' (Galaxy Series)  
Achillea × lewisii 'King Edward' 
'Lucky Break'  
 'Martina' 
'Mondpagode' 
''Moonshine'  
 'Summerwine'

References

This article incorporates text from the Hardy Perennials and Old Fashioned Flowers by John Wood, a publication now in the public domain.

filipendulina
Flora of Asia
Garden plants of Europe
Drought-tolerant plants
Taxa named by Jean-Baptiste Lamarck